The prostatic utricle (Latin for "small pouch of the prostate") is a small indentation in the prostatic urethra, at the apex of the urethral crest, on the seminal colliculus (verumontanum), laterally flanked by openings of the ejaculatory ducts. It is also known as the vagina masculina or uterus masculinus or (in older literature) vesicula prostatica.

Structure
It is often described as "blind", meaning that it is a duct that does not lead to any other structures. It tends to be about one cm in length. It can sometimes be enlarged. The utricle is deemed enlarged if it allows insertion of a cystoscope at least 2 cm deep. This is often associated with Hypospadias.

Function
The prostatic utricle is the homologue of the uterus and vagina, usually described as derived from the paramesonephric duct, although this is occasionally disputed.

In 1905 Robert William Taylor described the function of the utricle: "In coitus it so contracts that it draws upon the openings of the ejaculatory ducts, and thus renders them so patulous that the semen readily passes through."

See also
 List of related male and female reproductive organs

Notes

References

Further reading

External links
 "The Male Pelvis: The Prostate Gland"
 
 

Prostate
Vagina